Ye Weichao (born 18 February 1989) is a Chinese footballer who currently plays for China League One club Guangdong South China Tiger.

Club career
Ye started his football career in 2007 when he was loaned to Guangdong Sunray Cave from Guangzhou Pharmaceutical. He scored his first senior goal in a match against Ningbo Huaao on 23 June 2007. Ye steadily established himself within the team in the 2008 league season. He scored eleven goals for the club which ensured Guangdong Sunray Cave promote to China League One that season. Ye was called back to Guangzhou 's first team in December 2009 but did not stay for long. He was loaned back out to Guangdong Sunray Cave again in March 2010. He scored fourteen goals in twenty appearances in the 2010 season.

Ye returned to Guangzhou Evergrande before the 2011 season. He made his debut for Guangzhou on 15 May 2011 in a 3–1 win against Henan Construction, coming on as a substitute for Renato Cajá in the 67th minute and also scoring his first goal for the club. However, he was loaned out to China League Two side Meizhou Kejia in July 2013 after not establishing himself within the club. In February 2014, Ye moved back to Guangdong Sunray Cave on a one-year loan deal. Ye made trials with Hong Kong Premier League side Kitchee and Jiangxi Liansheng after he left Guangzhou Evergrande at the end of 2014 but couldn't stay.

On 26 February 2016, Ye was signed for China League One club Zhejiang Yiteng. He made his debut for Zhejiang on 9 July 2016 in a 4–0 away defeat against Tianjin Quanjian, coming on for Li Gen in the 63rd minute.

On 21 January 2017, Ye moved to League Two side Meixian Techand. On 11 November 2018 he scored the winning goal for Meixian in the extra time of 2018 China League One Relegation play-offs against Shaanxi Chang'an Athletic, which ensured Meixian Techand's stay in the second tier.

International career
Ye made his senior international debut for China in a 2–2 friendly against Costa Rica on 26 March 2011 in a 2-2 draw and assisted Gao Lin's game-tying goal in the injury time.

Career statistics
Statistics accurate as of match played 3 November 2018.

Honours

Club
Guangzhou Evergrande
Chinese Super League: 2011, 2012
Chinese FA Super Cup: 2012
Chinese FA Cup: 2012

Individual
China League Two Top goalscorer: 2008

References

External links
 
 

1989 births
Living people
Chinese footballers
Guangdong Sunray Cave players
Guangzhou F.C. players
Meizhou Hakka F.C. players
Zhejiang Yiteng F.C. players
Guangdong South China Tiger F.C. players
Chinese Super League players
China League One players
Footballers from Guangzhou
China international footballers
Association football forwards
21st-century Chinese people